Chipaque is a municipality and town in the Eastern Province of the department of Cundinamarca, Colombia. Chipaque borders Bogotá's southern locality Usme in the west. To the east, Chipaque borders Cáqueza, in the south Une and in the north Ubaque.

Etymology 
The name Chipaque is derived from the word Chipapabacue, Muysccubun for "Forest of our ancestors".

Symbols 
	Flag

The flag consists of two bands of the same size. One of them yellow and the other green. Yellow symbolizes wealth. Green symbolizes hope and also represents its rustic and fertile topography. A white triangle emerges from the side of the pole and its vertices converge at the center where the two bands meet.

	Seal

Emblem framed by the sides with the flags of Colombia and Cundinamarca. Its crossed flagpoles wear a yellow ribbon with the name of the municipality "Chipaque" written on it. In the lower part there is a typical landscape of the region and the sun.

Geology 

The Chipaque Formation, consisting of organic shales and sandstone beds, is named after Chipaque. The Páramo de Cruz Verde is located in the northern part of the municipality.

History 
Before the Spanish conquest of the Muisca, Chipaque was inhabited by the indigenous Muisca, organised in their loose Muisca Confederation. Chipaque was part of the cacicazgo of Ubaque. During the conquest, main conquistador Gonzalo Jiménez de Quesada sent Juan Tafur eastward. In 1538, he established the first church in Chipaque.

Modern Chipaque was founded on October 2, 1600, by Luis Enríquez.

Economy 
Main activities of Chipaque are livestock farming and agriculture, with potatoes (45%) and onions (25%) as most important products.

Gallery

References 

Municipalities of Cundinamarca Department
Populated places established in 1600
1600 establishments in the Spanish Empire
Muisca Confederation
Muysccubun